Sultan Saif Salim (Arabic:سلطان سيف سالم; born 7 May 1995) is an Emirati footballer. He currently plays for Al-Hamriyah as a defender .

Career
He formerly played for Al-Shaab, Ittihd Kalba, Dubai, Dibba Al-Hisn, and Al-Hamriyah.

References

External links
 

1988 births
Living people
Emirati footballers
Al-Shaab CSC players
Al-Ittihad Kalba SC players
Dubai CSC players
Dibba Al-Hisn Sports Club players
Al Hamriyah Club players
UAE Pro League players
UAE First Division League players
Association football defenders
Place of birth missing (living people)